Crown Towers is a high-rise apartment building in New Haven, Connecticut part of the New Haven Towers family of buildings. The  fifth-tallest building in the city, the  modernist building was New Haven's tallest residential building until the construction of several new developments in Downtown New Haven.

References

Residential buildings completed in 1967
Residential skyscrapers in Connecticut
Skyscrapers in New Haven, Connecticut
Apartment buildings in Connecticut
1967 establishments in Connecticut